The Moth is a non-profit group based in New York City dedicated to the art and craft of storytelling. Founded in 1997, the organization presents a wide range of theme-based storytelling events across the United States and abroad, often featuring prominent literary and cultural personalities alongside everyday people like veterans, astronauts, school teachers, and parents. The Moth offers a weekly podcast and in 2009 launched a national public radio show, The Moth Radio Hour, which won a 2010 Peabody Award. The Moth has published four books including The Moth: 50 True Stories (2013) reached #22 on The New York Times Paperback Nonfiction Best-Seller List; All These Wonders: True Stories about Facing the Unknown (2017); and Occasional Magic: True Stories About Defying the Impossible (2019) and How to Tell a Story: The Essential Guide to Memorable Storytelling from The Moth (2022). In September of 2022, The Moth published an interactive card deck called, A Game of Storytelling, which debut at #1 on Amazon's top selling card game list.

Origins
The Moth was founded in 1997 by poet and novelist George Dawes Green, who wanted to recreate the feeling of sultry summer evenings in his native Georgia, when moths were attracted to the light on the porch where he and his friends would gather to spin spellbinding tales. Green and his original group of storytellers called themselves "The Moths", and Green took the name with him to New York City. The non-profit organization now runs over 600 different storytelling events a year in more than 27 US cities (including New York City, Los Angeles, Chicago, and Detroit) and two cities outside the US (London and Melbourne) offering the unique perspectives of both average, everyday people, and literary or cultural personalities.

Live events

The Moth's live shows fall into several tiers of production, but each is dedicated to the art of unscripted, first-person storytelling. Every show has stories based on open-ended themes (Such as "Hot Mess," or "Conviction").

Mainstage 
The Moth Mainstage is their curated flagship program, which is a "staple" of the literary scenes in New York City and Los Angeles and regularly tours around the United States and the world as The Moth on the Road. Storytellers at the Mainstages include renowned personalities, past StorySLAM or GrandSLAM winners, and average people who may have submitted their stories through The Moth Pitchline.

StorySLAMS and GrandSLAMS 
The organization also hosts The Moth StorySLAM events, which are open mic storytelling competitions open to everyone in cities across the United States, including but not limited to New York City, Detroit, Chicago, Houston, Louisville, Ann Arbor, Pittsburgh, Miami, Cambridge, and Los Angeles. The format was inspired by and is similar to poetry slams.

For the StorySLAM, ten participants are chosen at random from a pool of volunteer storytellers to tell a true story or tall tale (without notes) in the five minute range. Storytellers are scored based on the content of their stories, and their storytelling abilities, by three teams of judges—selected from audience members—on a scale from one to ten. The storyteller with the highest score wins the StorySLAM.

After 10 StorySLAMS have occurred in a city, the 10 winners then advance to The Moth GrandSLAM, which draws crowds of hundreds (or thousands) and as a result is held in a larger venue than the monthly StorySLAMs. The same rules apply to the GrandSLAM as in the StorySLAM.

Programs 
In addition to live performances, The Moth conducts a variety of community, education, and corporate workshops that teach the art and craft of storytelling in various regions and communities.

Community 
Since 1999, the Moth's Community Program strives to encourage the art of storytelling in communities typically under-represented by the mainstream media. They teach and inspire budding raconteurs to effectively tell their stories to those who are both willing and unwilling to listen, and they often feature workshop members on The Moth website and podcast.

Education 
The Education Program works with students, teachers, and professors from high-school through college to promote stronger community bonds within the student body and the administration. The overall mission is to prepare students for the world ahead of them by teaching crucial aspects of language and rhetoric, and to allow students and teachers to experience one another in a more intimate setting. In 2012 The Moth launched the High School Slam program, which brings StorySLAMs to public high schools in New York City. They currently hold SLAMs at twelve high schools in three boroughs, and an All-City SLAM that allows for inter-connectivity between students in all the boroughs.

MothWorks 
MothWorks uses the essential elements of Moth storytelling at work and other unexpected places. Private workshops teach employees to use the power of storytelling to promote their business goals and ideas, while custom events to highlight the voices and mission of an organization in a unique setting.

Broadcasting
In August 2009, the organization launched a national public radio show, The Moth Radio Hour, produced by Jay Allison and distributed by Public Radio Exchange. In 2010 The Moth Radio Hour won a Peabody Award. Now airing on 575 public radio stations,The Moth Radio Hour, garners more than 1,000,000 listeners each week.

The Moth offers a weekly podcast, which provides free audio of curated stories from live Moth events. The podcast is downloaded over 100 million times each year.

Publishing

On September 3, 2013 Hyperion Books published The Moth: 50 True Stories, a collection of stories from the group's performance history. In December 2013 it reached #22 on The New York Times Paperback Nonfiction Best-Seller List. A second book, All These Wonders: True Stories about Facing the Unknown, was released by Crown in March 2017. Michiko Kakutani of The New York Times called it "wonderful". A third book, Occasional Magic: True Stories about Defying the Impossible, was released by Crown in March 2019, and was praised by Kirkus Reviews for its "captivating, artfully wrought tales." In 2022, The Moth released its fourth book, How to Tell a Story: The Essential Guide to Memorable Storytelling from The Moth, which debuted at #6 on The New York Times Advice, How-To & Miscellaneous Best-Sellers list, No. 6 on IndieBound's Hardcover Nonfiction Best Sellers list and # 12 on Publishers Weekly Best Sellers List. In September of 2022, The Moth published an interactive card deck called, A Game of Storytelling, which debut at #1 on Amazon's top selling card game list.

Moth Ball and Moth Award
The organization's annual fundraising event is called the Moth Ball. William McGowan of The Wall Street Journal called the ball the "hottest and hippest literary ticket" in 1999, and more recently Jen Carlson of Gothamist called it "NYC's Best Gala". At this event they present the Moth Award, celebrating the art of the raconteur. Past awards have gone to David Byrne, Regina King, Kemp Powers, Padma Lakshmi, Roxane Gay, Roz Chast, Zadie Smith, Carrie Brownstein,  Garrison Keillor, Salman Rushdie, Anna Deavere Smith, Calvin Trillin, Spalding Gray (posthumously), Martin Scorsese, Albert Maysles and more.

Controversies

Media critic Jack Shafer criticized best-selling author Malcolm Gladwell for telling a fictionalized story about his work at The Washington Post that was picked up by the Moth public radio show.  Gladwell responded by pointing out that the Moth includes both true stories and the occasional tall tale. He said his piece clearly fell into the latter category.

Storytellers
As of 2018, over 50,000 stories have been told at The Moth.
Storytellers include:

 Jonathan Ames, author
 Maurice Ashley, chess grandmaster
 Wesley Autrey, recipient of the Bronze Medallion for bravery by the City of New York
 Elna Baker, ex-Mormon author
 Mike Birbiglia, comedian
 Andy Borowitz, humorist
 David Chang, chef
 Margaret Cho, comedian
 Daniel Choi, activist
 Kimya Dawson, musician
 Thomas Dolby, musician
 Rachel Dratch, comedian
 Ophira Eisenberg, comedian and public radio host
 Ed Gavagan, furniture designer
 Malcolm Gladwell, author and journalist
 Adam Gopnik, author
 Ethan Hawke, actor, writer and director
 Christopher Hitchens, author, essayist, journalist, columnist
 Lisa P. Jackson, former EPA Administrator
 Ava Kay Jones, Voodoo priestess
 Garrison Keillor, public radio host
 Padma Lakshmi, television host
 Faye Lane, storyteller and solo performer
 Janna Levin, astrophysicist
 Joe Lockhart, former White House Press Secretary
 Dr. George Lombardi, infectious disease specialist
 Michael Massimino, astronaut
 Darryl "DMC" McDaniels, musician
 Moby, musician
 Edgar Oliver, author and playwright
 Steve Osborne, NYPD detective
 George Plimpton, author
 Sherman "O.T." Powell, former pickpocket
 Annie Proulx, author and journalist
 Cynthia Riggs, author and grandmother
 Molly Ringwald, actress and author
 Daisy Rosario, comedian, journalist, and producer
 Salman Rushdie, author
 Dan Savage, author
 Al Sharpton, activist
 Satori Shakoor, comedian, sketch actress, singer, writer
 Lili Taylor, actress
 Suzanne Vega, musician
 Magda Szubanski, comedian

References 
Notes

Further reading

External links 
 
 The Moth, on SoundCloud
 
 
 
 
 
 

Storytelling organizations
Audio podcasts
Radio in New York City
Non-profit organizations based in New York City
Peabody Award-winning radio programs
2009 podcast debuts
2007 establishments in New York City
Podcasts adapted for other media